King's Park is a  park and residential subdivision in Fort Richmond, a suburb in southern Winnipeg, located on the western side of the Red River. Its grounds include Chinese pagoda gardens in the centre of the park, a soccer field, two baseball diamonds, an off leash dog park area and marshland, home of waterfowl and wildlife.

History

Neighbourhood 
Having the University of Manitoba nearby increased the land value from $125.00 to $4,000 per acre. Adjacent to the park, 124 treed lots were subdivided for housing.

Electric streetcar service was planned early on, to serve both the Park and the Agricultural College.

The subdivision has the King's Park Community Club. Originally activities took place at St. Avila School until a separate building could be built.

Park 
The  Park features two baseball diamonds, an off leash dog walk, football and soccer fields, Chinese pagoda,  lake including a waterfall,

References

External links
Winnipeg.ca - King's Park

Parks in Winnipeg
Year of establishment missing